David Scott (1837 – 11 January 1893) was an Australian politician.

Scott was born in Broughty Ferry in Scotland in 1837. In 1886 he was elected to the Tasmanian House of Assembly, representing the seat of South Launceston. He served until his defeat in 1891. He returned to Parliament in September 1892 after winning a by-election for North Launceston, but died four months later in January 1893.

References

1837 births
1893 deaths
Members of the Tasmanian House of Assembly